The 2010 Great Yarmouth Borough Council election took place on 6 May 2010 to elect members of Great Yarmouth Borough Council in Norfolk, England. One third of the council was up for election and the Conservative Party stayed in overall control of the council.

After the election, the composition of the council was:
Conservative 24
Labour 15

Background
Before the election the Conservatives held control of the council with 24 seats, compared to 15 for Labour. 14 seats were contested at the election with both the Conservative and Labour parties defending 7 seats. Claydon ward had 2 seats up for election after Labour councillor Dick Barker died in February 2010. Both the Conservative and Labour parties contested all 14 seats, while there were also 5 Liberal Democrats and 2 independent candidates.

With the council election being held at the same time as the general election, local issues including the outer harbour, an additional river crossing and local regeneration, were mixed with national issues during the campaign.

Election result
The Conservatives remained in control of the council, with the political balance on the council staying the same. The Conservatives gained a seat in Caister South from Labour, but lost one back to Labour in Yarmouth North.

In Yarmouth North both candidates tied on 1,034 votes each after four recounts. As a result, a pack of playing cards was used to determine the result. The Conservative candidate, Bob Peck, drew a three and Labour's Charlie Marsden then drew a seven. Therefore, Labour were allocated one more vote and gained the seat from the Conservatives.

Ward results

References

2010 English local elections
May 2010 events in the United Kingdom
2010
2010s in Norfolk